Jamnalal Bajaj Award is an Indian award, for promoting Gandhian values, community service and social development. Established in 1978, by the Jamnalal Bajaj Foundation of Bajaj Group, it is given annually in four categories, and usually presented by the President, Vice president, Prime Minister of India or a leading figure. The foundation currently headed by Rahul Bajaj, was created in 1977, in the memory of group founder, philanthropist and a close associate of Mahatma Gandhi, Jamnalal Bajaj. The award ceremony takes place on his birth anniversary, November 4.

Awards
The award comprises a citation, a trophy and a cheque of Rs Ten lakh each. It is given in four categories, namely:
 Constructive Work, established in 1978.
 Application of Science and Technology for Rural development, established in 1978.
 Outstanding contribution for the Development and Welfare of Women and Children, established in 1980 in memory of Janaki Devi Bajaj.
 International Award for promoting Gandhian values outside India, which is given to an individual of foreign nationality, established in 1988 on the birth centenary of Jamnalal Bajaj.

To commemorate the birth centenary of Mr. Jamnalal Bajaj, the Foundation presented a special award to Dr. Nelson Mandela in 1990.

List of awardees

See also

 List of awards for contributions to society

References

External links
 Jamnalal Bajaj Award at the Jamnalal Bajaj Award Foundation

Bajaj Group
Indian awards
Awards established in 1978
Awards for contributions to society
Gandhism
1978 establishments in India